In molecular biology mir-872 microRNA is a short RNA molecule. MicroRNAs function to regulate the expression levels of other genes by several mechanisms.

Sertoli Cell Expression
miR-872 has been found to be expressed in sertoli cells and to post-transcriptionally target the Sod-1 gene, which encodes the copper/zinc-binding superoxide dismutase 1 (SOD-1) enzyme. Overproduction of SOD-1 increases oxidative damage and through this results in enhanced apoptosis and cell death.

Insulin-regulated HO-1 expression
Insulin infusion in rats has seen increased levels of heme-oxygenase 1 expression, blocked by inhibited activation of PI3K or protein kinase C. miR-872 levels are reduced with inhibition of adipocytes of the 3T3-L1 cell line, along with those of miRNAs-155 and -183. Insulin is therefore able to increase expression of HO-1 through miR-872 downregulation, as well as via pathways dependent upon PI3K and protein kinase C.

See also 
 MicroRNA

References

External links
 

MicroRNA
MicroRNA precursor families